The Central Coast Australian Football League was an Australian rules football league based in the Central Coast region of New South Wales, Australia that was active from 1976 until 1999.

The CCAFL was founded in 1976 when interest of Australian rules football began developing on the Central Coast, a region just north of Sydney, although the sport in the region was played earlier. The Gosford Australian Football Club was founded in 1971, the first and oldest Aussie rules club on the Central Coast, and played in the Newcastle Australian Football League and played their first season in 1972, fielding teams in First and Second grades. It remained there until 1975 when it was decided that the Central Coast needed its own Australian rules football competition.

The competition began in 1976 and consisted of 5 teams: Gosford, Narara-Wyoming, Terrigal, The Lakes and Woy Woy. The number of teams continued to grow from 1978 when Killarney Vale were founded and joined the league, playing their first season the same year. Narara disbanded the following year, in 1979. Killarney Vale split to form Bateau Bay in 1984. That same year also saw Gosford Wyoming split up to form Wyoming. Although Bateau Bay remained as a separate club, Wyoming would join back up with Gosford in 1986. North Central Coast, known as the Kangaroos, joined in 1995 and folded after the 1996 season. The number of teams rose from 5 to 8 in 19 years, each club supporting junior and senior teams in different age groups.

After the 1999 season, the league merged with the Newcastle Australian Football League to form the Black Diamond Australian Football League.

Clubs 
 Bateau Bay
 Gosford
 Killarney Vale
 Narara-Wyoming
 North Central Coast
 Terrigal-Avoca
 Woy Woy
 Wyong Lakes

Central Coast Australian Football League Premierships 

Onward from 2000, all Premiers are listed under the Black Diamond Australian Football League.

References

See also 
 Australian rules football in New South Wales
 Newcastle Australian Football League
 Black Diamond Australian Football League

Australian rules football governing bodies
Defunct Australian rules football competitions in New South Wales
1976 establishments in Australia
1999 disestablishments in Australia
Sport on the Central Coast (New South Wales)